The Baptist Churches of New England (BCNE) is a network of churches located in New England and affiliated with the Southern Baptist Convention. Headquartered in Northborough, Massachusetts, the convention is made up of around 370 churches as of 2018. The Baptist Churches of New England was founded in 1983 and subscribes to the theological beliefs expressed in The Baptist Faith and Message (2000).

Affiliated organizations 
Baptist Foundation of New England

References

External links
Baptist Convention of New England
The Baptist Faith and Message (2000)

New England
Baptist Christianity in Massachusetts
Religion in New England
Baptist Christianity in New Hampshire
Baptist Christianity in Rhode Island
Protestantism in Connecticut
Baptist Christianity in Vermont
Baptist Christianity in Maine
Christian organizations established in 1983
Baptist Christianity in Connecticut